The 2004 Kansas City Royals season  was a season in American baseball. It involved the Royals finishing 5th in the American League Central with a record of 58 wins and 104 losses. It was one of the most disappointing seasons in Royals' history. The team had been picked by many sporting magazines to win the AL Central following their third-place finish in 2003. Injuries of veteran acquisitions did the Royals in. Catcher Benito Santiago and outfielder Juan González both played very few games for the boys in blue. Mike Sweeney was also injured during the campaign. As a result, the Royals set a new record for most losses in franchise history.

Offseason
 January 6, 2004: Juan González signed as a free agent with the Kansas City Royals.
 January 16, 2004: Doug Linton was signed as a free agent with the Kansas City Royals.

Regular season

Season standings

Record vs. opponents

Transactions
July 30, 2004: Justin Huber was traded by the New York Mets to the Kansas City Royals for José Bautista.

Roster

Player stats

Batting

Starters by position
Note: Pos = Position; G = Games played; AB = At bats; H = Hits; Avg. = Batting average; HR = Home runs; RBI = Runs batted in

Other batters
Note: G = Games played; AB = At bats; H = Hits; Avg. = Batting average; HR = Home runs; RBI = Runs batted in

Pitching

Starting pitchers
Note: G = Games pitched; IP = Innings pitched; W = Wins; L = Losses; ERA = Earned run average; SO = Strikeouts

Other pitchers
Note: G = Games pitched; IP = Innings pitched; W = Wins; L = Losses; ERA = Earned run average; SO = Strikeouts

Relief pitchers
Note: G = Games pitched; W = Wins; L = Losses; SV = Saves; ERA = Earned run average; SO = Strikeouts

Farm system

References

External links
2004 Kansas City Royals team page at Baseball Reference
2004 Kansas City Royals team page at www.baseball-almanac.com

Kansas City Royals seasons
Kansas
Kansas City Royals